Old School Baptist Church and Cemetery (South River War Memorial Free Public Library) is a historic church at 64—66 Main Street in South River, Middlesex County, New Jersey, United States.

It was built in 1805 and added to the National Register of Historic Places on January 7, 1992.

References

Baptist cemeteries in the United States
Baptist churches in New Jersey
Churches on the National Register of Historic Places in New Jersey
Churches completed in 1805
19th-century Baptist churches in the United States
Churches in South River, New Jersey
National Register of Historic Places in Middlesex County, New Jersey
New Jersey Register of Historic Places
1805 establishments in New Jersey
Churches in Middlesex County, New Jersey